= Shingkar Monastery =

Buddhist monastery in Bhutan

- Location within Bhutan

Religion
- Affiliation: Tibetan Buddhism

Location
- Location: Bhutan
- Country: Bhutan
- Interactive map of Shingkar Monastery
- Coordinates: 27°29′43″N 90°56′48″E

Shingkar Monastery is a Buddhist monastery in Bhutan.
